Club Atlético Excursionistas is an Argentine sports club based in the Belgrano neighbourhood of Buenos Aires. The club is mainly known for their football team. It currently plays in the Primera C Metropolitana, the fourth level of the Argentine football league system.

History

The beginning 
The club was founded in 1910 in the Belgrano neighborhood of Buenos Aires. The name "Excursionistas" (which could roughly be translated as "Voyagers" from Spanish to English) was chosen due to the founders' constant trips (voyages) to the Paraná River and Isla Maciel to compete in athletic tournaments. They initially named the club "Club Unión Excursionistas".

The first jersey worn was green (for the color of grass) with a horizontal white stripe (white referred to the tablecloths used in the picnics they frequently had).

Entering the football league 
Excursionistas disputed its first tournament in 1911, playing its home games at "Club Florida", an institution of Florida neighborhood in Greater Buenos Aires. Before the 1912 season, the club acquired a land in Belgrano neighborhood, where its stadium was built, more precisely on the corner of streets La Pampa and Miñones.

In 1916, the team was promoted to the second division (then named División Intermedia) after defeating Palermo by 1–0. In 1919 the club changed its name to the current "Club Atlético Excursionistas", also modifying its jersey, which vertical stripes of white and green.

Promotion to the first division - 20s to 50s 

In 1924, in the old San Lorenzo de Almagro stadium, Excursionistas defeated Talleres de Remedios de Escalada 2–1, thus proclaiming themselves champion and earning the promotion to Primera División. More than 10,000 spectators attended the match.

In 1931 goalkeeper Fortunato Grimoldi was called up to the Argentina national team. He also appeared on the cover of El Gráfico (the most important sports magazine in Latin America) in 1930.

In 1934 the Argentine Football Association (which Excursionistas was affiliated to) merged with dissident Liga Argentina de Football in a unified league. This restructuring sent Excursionistas to the second division along with many other teams that decided to continue as amateurs. Since then, the club has remained in the lower divisions of Argentine football.

In 1942 Excursionistas finished 2nd after Rosario Central. That team, coached by Pedro Tilhet, is regarded by fans as the best Excursionistas team of all-time. In 1957 Excursionistas had to play a playoff series against Argentino de Quilmes in order to define which team would be relegated to second division. After a 2–2 draw in the first game, Excursionistas achieved a great 6–1 win in the second match, so the team kept its place in Primera División and sent off Argentino to Primera B.

1970 - 2010 
In 1972 Excursionistas was relegated to Primera C, where they remained until 1995 when the team was promoted to Primera B, although they lasted there for just one season.  During the 1998–99 season Excursionistas made a great campaign, putting together a 16 match unbeaten streak.  The following season (1999–2000), the squad, coached by Néstor Rapa, achieved a historic landmark of 10 consecutive wins, finishing in 1st place and thus earning promotion.  Nevertheless, the institution was punished with a 21-point deduction due to the riot caused by a portion of its fans during the match against Club Comunicaciones, in which the fans invaded the pitch and attacked the Comunicaciones players. As a result, Excursionistas missed the opportunity to earn promotion.

In 2001, Excursionistas won the Clausura tournament, although the team was not promoted due to the restructuring of the tournament format. That title only earned Excursionistas the right to play a two-leg semi-final for the right to earn promotion. Their rival on the occasion was Deportivo Laferrere, who proceeded to eliminate Excursionistas. The results were 2-0 for Laferrere in the first leg and 3-2 for Excursionistas in the second, which meant Excursionistas were eliminated on global 4-3.

2010 onward 
In the 2010–11 season, Excursionistas finished 8th in the division, thus qualifying for the second phase of the tournament. They then qualified for a subsequent round against Talleres (RE) after winning 3-1 at home and 0-1 away, before being eliminated by Argentino de Merlo due to a 1-2 home defeat and a 0-0 away draw. Excursionistas' defense remained the most invulnerable in the division that season, with only 27 goals scored against in 38 matches.

In the 2016 "Campeonato Transición Primera C," Excursionistas was crowned champion after beating Sacachispas 1-0, thus earning the only spot for promotion to Primera B in the season. The team reached 41 points in the season on a record of 12 victories, 5 draws, 2 defeats, 36 goals for and 24 against. Their standout player for the season was Leonardo Ruiz, who finished the season as top scorer with 16 goals.

Presidents 

1910–12 	Oscar Piñera
1913–14 	Raúl Gantes
1915–16	Eusebio Gorostidi
1917–19 	Amadeo Aldini
1920–26 	Julio Ferraris
1927        José David
1928 	 Francisco Greco
1929–30 	Julio Ferraris
1931–35 	Eusebio Gorostidi
1936–43 	Armando Policella
1944–51 	José David
1952–53 	Pedro Guerra
1954 	José Giordano
1955–56 	Dr. Anselmo Bidoglio
1957 	Dr. Germán Wernicke
1958 	Antonio Lleira
1959–60 	Dr. Anselmo Bidoglio
1961–63 	Luis Martín
1964 	 Rogelio Fortunato
1965 –67 	Jorge de Santo Monasterio
1968 	Dr. Anselmo Bidoglio
1969–73 	Rogelio Fortunato
1974–81 	Carlos Ianowski
1982–85 	Dr. Guillermo Black
1986–87 	Enrique Viva
1988–91 	Antonio Gorsd
1992 	Raúl Padró
1993–98 	Rogelio Pita
1998–02  Camilo Scorpaniti
2002–10  	Armando Mainoli
2010 	Angel Lozano

Stadium 

The Stadium does not have official name. It is informally known as "El Coliseo del Bajo Belgrano " or "Pampa y Miñones". It has capacity for 8,000 spectators.

Other Sports

Academy 
In the club's academy, children between 5 and 18 years old learn and play representing the club in championships organized by AFA.

Futsal 
The club has a Futsal section. It is affiliated to AFA and plays in the División de Honor.

Women's Football 
The club has a women's football team that is affiliated to AFA, and plays in Campeonato de Fútbol Femenino.

Honours 
 División Intermedia (1): 1924 AAm 
 '''Primera C (2): 1926, 2016

Notes

References

External links 

 
 Excursio un Sentimiento Blog (can be translated to English) 
 Excursio Casacas (Excursinistas shirts)

Association football clubs established in 1910
Football clubs in Buenos Aires
CA Excursionistas